Andreas Acoluthus (16 March 1654 – 4 November 1704) was a German scholar of orientalism and professor of theology at Breslau (Wrocław). A native of Bernstadt (Bierutów), Lower Silesia, he was the son of Johannes Acoluthus, pastor of St. Elisabeth and superintendent of the churches and schools of Breslau.

Early life and education 

He attended the school of St. Elisabeth in Breslau and was in taught by August Pfeiffer in: Rabbinic, Arabic, Persian, Syriac and Ethiopian. He later also learned Mauritanian, Turkish, Coptic, Armenian and Chinese. In 1674 he went to Wittenberg, then Leipzig, where he held private lectures on oriental languages.

By circumstance, he came into possession of an Armenian Bible, so that he was able to publish in 1680 the first Armenian print in Germany, prophet Obadiah with observations.

Acoluthus returned in 1683 to Breslau where he entered the practical religious service. In 1689 he became professor of the Hebrew language at the St. Elisabeth school, one year later he became senior at St. Bernhard.

Studies 

His studies reached a new zenith when an Arabic manuscript of the Qur'an with translations into Persian and Turkish was looted during the wars against the Ottoman Empire. At this time, the Qur'an was almost unknown in Germany, as the only other known edition in Arabic script was burned by order of the pope. Therefore, Acoluthus decided to publish this book with a Latin translation, a plan which found the goodwill of Frederick III of Saxony. The latter provided Acoluthus with a yearly pension. However, only a partial edition was published. Acoluthus was in the following accepted as a member of the Prussian Academy of Sciences in Berlin.

Andreal Acoluthus was the father of Johann Karl Acoluthus von Folgersberg, who was ennobled by Charles VI.

Publications

 De aquis zelotypiae amaris, 1682
 Specimen alcorani quadrilinguis, 1701

References

 Allgemeine Deutsche Biographie - online version at Wikisource

1654 births
1704 deaths
People from Bierutów
German orientalists
Members of the Prussian Academy of Sciences
People from Austrian Silesia
University of Wittenberg alumni
Leipzig University alumni
German male non-fiction writers